Raman Astapenka (born 10 March 1980) is a Belarusian retired professional footballer. His last club was Neman Grodno, where he played until 2011.

External links

1980 births
Living people
Belarusian footballers
FC RUOR Minsk players
FC Neman Grodno players
FC Energetik-BGU Minsk players
FC Dynamo Brest players
FC Darida Minsk Raion players
Association football goalkeepers